Sanjay Gandhi National Park, also known as SGNP, is an  protected area in Mumbai, Maharashtra. It was established in 1969 with its headquarters situated at Borivali.

The 2400-year-old Kanheri caves, sculpted by monks out of the rocky basaltic cliffs, lie within the park. The rich flora and fauna of the Sanjay Gandhi National Park attract more than 2 million visitors every year.

History

The area of the Sanjay Gandhi National Park has a long written history dating back to the 4th century BCE. In Ancient India, Sopara and Kalyan were two ports in its vicinity that traded with ancient civilisations such as Greece and Mesopotamia. The  land route between these two ports was partially passing through this forest.

The Kanheri caves, located centrally in the park, were important Buddhist learning centres and pilgrimage sites sculpted by Buddhist monks (using primitive sculpting tools) between the 9th and the 1st centuries BCE. They were chiselled out of a massive basaltic rock outcropping. The monks carved exquisite Buddhist carvings and designs within the caves, and even had properly built spaces designated as kitchens, dining halls, etc., with drainages built alongside the halls.

The Brihanmumbai Municipal Corporation (formerly called the Bombay Municipal Corporation) acquired the catchment areas of the Tulsi and Vihar lakes and also included land from the government dairy of Aarey under protection. Hence, the Krishnagiri National Park was established under the Bombay National Park Act in 1942. At that time, the area of the park was only . The dairy development board began operations near Krishnagiri National Park in 1954, but outside the area of the park. In 1969,  of the land of the Aarey Milk Scheme (now known as Aarey Milk Colony) was transferred to the forest department. However, this area was not notified as reserved or within protected forests.

The communication also directed that  of the revenue land should be used to build a recreational zone, while the remaining   will remain a part of the National Park. On 10 October 1980, another communication from the FDCM Nagpur to Thane, directed the latter to declare the area as either reserved or within protected forests to allow the department to have stricter legal control. However, no such declaration was made. In 1996, the park was renamed to its current title, Sanjay Gandhi National Park, after Sanjay Gandhi.

Geography
The park occupies most of the northern suburbs of Mumbai. To the west lie the suburbs of Goregaon, Malad, Kandivali, Borivali and Dahisar. To the east lie the suburbs of Bhandup and Mulund. To the south lies the Aarey Milk Colony and the university campus of IIT Bombay. The northern reaches of this forest lie in Thane city. The park and the areas surrounding it, except Thane city, are all part of Mumbai. It is the only protected forest located within the limits of a city.

The park has two lakes, Vihar Lake and Tulsi Lake, which meet a part of the city's water requirements. The park is said to be the lungs of the city as it purifies much of the air pollution in the city.

Biodiversity

The park is forestland, with an estimated 800 types of mauve. This flower is native to the park and the surrounding regions, including Karnala, the Yeoor hills, Tungareshwar, and some parts of Goregaon's Film City. The park is also home to a small population of leopards.

Wildlife
The park is home to a number of endangered species of flora and fauna. The forest area of the park houses over 1,000 plant species, 251 species of migratory, land, and water birds, 5,000 species of insects, and 40 species of mammals. In addition, the park also provides shelter to 38 species of reptiles, 9 species of amphibians, 150 species of butterflies, and a large variety of fish.

Flora
Kadamba, teak, karanj, shisham, and species of acacia, ziziphus, euphorbia, flame of the forest, red silk cotton tree, and a number of other varieties of flowers.

Mass flowering of karvi

The karvi (or karvy) shrub, as it is locally called in the Marathi language, only blooms once in eight years in a mass flowering covering the forest floor in a lavender blush. It grows in abundance in the Western Ghats hills near Mumbai and throughout the Sanjay Gandhi National Park as in other parts of its natural range. In the Sanjay Gandhi National Park, its last blooming occurred in 2016, and it is scheduled to bloom here again in late August-early October 2024. Termed by nature enthusiasts as 'nature's miracle,' the flowers are densest on some of the inner paths and trails that lie undisturbed in the park. It survives best on the vast sloping expanses of the hillsides, with the Kanheri caves area of the park being one of the best places to observe large areas of blooms.

In the state of Maharashtra, the mass flowering of karvi has been observed to occur in Mumbai in the same year as in the hill station of Khandala and one year earlier in Bhimashankar and Malshej Ghat, beyond Kalyan. Near Mumbai, the karvi is also found in Karnala, the Yeoor hills, Tungareshwar and some parts of Goregaon including Film City.

Fauna 

The forest cover in the park helps provide the ideal habitat for many wild animals. Chital (or spotted deer), rhesus macaque and bonnet macaque are some of the wild mammals often spotted inside the park. Other large mammals found in the park include black-naped or Indian hare, muntjac (barking deer), porcupine, Asian palm civet, chevrotain (mouse deer), Hanuman or grey langur, Indian flying fox, sambar deer and leopard.

Reptiles living here include crocodiles in the Tulsi Lake, pythons, cobras, monitor lizards, Russell's vipers, bamboo pit viper and Ceylonese cat snakes.

In 2003, pugmarks and droppings of a Bengal tiger were found in the park. Although the tiger was never widely sighted, it did bring some excitement to city folks as records of tiger being found here are quite old and forgotten now with the last tiger being shot down 80 years earlier in the region. Conservation was also proposed for the interlinked habitat corridors and nearby forest areas in the state along with upgrading their status as tiger habitat.

A total 172 species of butterflies have been reported here, of which the spectacular ones are blue Mormon, the phenomenal artist of camouflage, blue oak leaf, bright Jezebel and large yellow and white orange tip, tiger butterfly, eggflies and sailers. There are a number of moths too. The largest moth is the size of a sparrow (30 cm).

Avifauna: Some of the birds found in the park are jungle owlets, golden orioles, racket-tailed drongos, minivets, magpies, robins, hornbills, bulbuls, sunbirds, peacock, and woodpeckers. Migratory and local birds such as the paradise flycatcher and various species of kingfishers, mynas, drongos, swifts, gulls, egrets, and herons have also been spotted.

Threats
The park has faced a number of problems similar to those faced by national parks elsewhere in the world, involving conflicts between natural and human interests.

In the early 2000s, a road, as proposed, would have cut through the park. Animal activist Tarun Nayar went to court to halt this project.

The lack of space in Mumbai has pushed residential colonies right up to the park boundary. This boundary is poorly fenced, and wild animals often wander into human habitations. Slums have mushroomed around the park as well. Corruption among local politicians and Mumbai's influential builder lobby are commonly seen as responsible for a perceived shrinking of the park.

In June 2004, leopards were responsible for the deaths of 20 humans within the span of a week. This was not the first attack: for the past 10 years, there have been attacks attributed to leopards stalking children and adults outside the park fringes. After an outcry was raised and the situation reached alarming proportions, eight leopards were caught and relocated.

The leopard threat still continues in and around the Thane district today, with repeated sightings as well as attacks on pets and humans. On 16 July 2012, a seven-year-old girl was killed in Mulund right outside her home by a leopard. A year later, a 40-year-old woman was attacked and killed by a leopard in Bhiwandi, Thane City, in 2013. Five days later, a 14-year-old shepherd survived a leopard attack in the same region. In 2014, a two-year-old child went missing from Ghoong village in Wada. August 2015 saw four leopard attacks in Thane city. In one incident, a leopard and her cub dragged a one-year-old Rottweiler off.

Poaching

Unfortunately, Sanjay Gandhi National Park has seen many poachers in recent years. Usually, leopards are attacked. In many cases, these animals have been poisoned, and claws or other valuable body parts were cut off and presumed sold. Poaching could soon wipe out Mumbai's leopard population.

Fire

During the summer and any time before the monsoon, fires burn in the park, at least once every two weeks. This has resulted in the loss of rare trees and habitats for wild animals. The locals are often suspected of burning the trees on some of the outskirts of the forest to build homes there.

Tourism

Sanjay Gandhi National Park is said to be one of the most visited national parks in Asia. According to estimates, around 2 million visitors visit this park annually. Collection at the gates in November 2004 touched .

The Krishnagiri Upavan is an area of approximately  reserved as an easily accessible public recreation zone inside the park, while access to the remaining area is restricted. Among the several attractions of the Krishnagiri Upavan is a mini-zoo, a crocodile park, and the lion and tiger safaris through the natural habitats of these animals. A narrow-gauge train travels around the tourist zone, showcasing parts of the forest's rich biodiversity. Boating facilities such as two-person, pedal-powered boats are available for a nominal fee. Two watchtowers afford panoramic views of the park.

Hundreds of thousands of visitors travel to the Kanheri Caves, especially during festivals such as Maha Shivaratri. Nature trails and treks are also popular. Rock climbing enthusiasts often visit the national park as the numerous rock faces there and at the Kanheri Caves offer opportunities for rock climbers. There are many smaller parks within the national park with flower gardens, mini-waterfalls, resting spots, sunrise/sunset views, the occasional deer, and the misty boating lake.

Van Rani narrow gauge train

The park also features a "toy train" that runs on a narrow gauge railway. Named Van Rani, which means "jungle queen," it was operational for about twenty-five years before it was discontinued in 2001 because of the poor condition of the track. The circuitous route covers a  distance. The tracks were repaired, and the train was restarted. It offers a 15-minute ride along the foothills of the Mahatma Gandhi Memorial at  Pavilion Hill traverses a couple of bridges and tunnels and passes over the Deer Park.

Boating
Boating services are available near the Van Rani starting point with 2- and 4-seater pedalos for sailing in the small lake, which has a view bridge where visitors can stand and watch the boats in the water.

Tiger and lion safaris

Main attractions of the park are lion and tiger safaris for encouraging eco-tourism. The lion safari is a 20-minute ride through a  fenced forest area in one of the park's green buses. The park is home to an estimated 25 lions and lionesses, of which only 2 can be safely seen at close range from the caged buses. The remaining 23 have been relocated or placed in fenced areas far away from the roads used by the green buses. During visiting hours, some of the resident lions are let out into the enclosure and can be viewed from the safety of the bus. There are 4 tigers that are kept semi-confined in a  fenced area that is toured by the buses. This is done so that all visitors can safely view lions and tigers in their natural habitat. Here the visitors are caged in the bus so the big cats can roam like in the wild. Two other tigers roam in a much larger area. There are many claims that these tigers and lions are tranquilized in the interests of tourism.

Walking trails
There are a number of public walking trails in the national park. The popular Ashok Van trail winds through thick forest to a dense cluster of Ashoka trees that are a welcome halfway resting spot. The return journey is usually via the Gaumukh trail that leads to an open volcanic rock face and ends at the Kanheri caves. A more challenging route is called the 'View Point' trail and leads to the highest point in Mumbai, which affords a panoramic view of the city and its three lakes – Tulsi Lake, Vihar Lake and Powai Lake. New jungle trails at Sanjay Gandhi National Park allow visitors to see the more unexplored parts of the park for a nominal fee. They are the  Shilonda Trail, the  Malad Trail, and the  Yeoor Trail. The Nagla Forest Block Trail is a famous  trail which ends in the mangroves of the Vasai Creek, and is home to many bird species.

Local conservation NGOs such as the Bombay Natural History Society (BNHS) and World Wildlife Fund for Nature-India (WWF-India) bring groups of urban residents from Mumbai and elsewhere, sometimes in collaboration with other organisations, for regular guided nature education walks in the nature trails of Sanjay Gandhi National Park and organise special trips when the rare karvi (Strobilanthes callosa) flowers are in full bloom which only happens once every eight years.

Jain temple

Trimurti Temple
In the forest, there is a famous Jain temple called Trimurti (meaning "three idols") or Trimurti Digambar Jain Mandir. This temple is widely visited by Digambar sect of the Jain community. It has three huge idols of Lord Adinath and his two sons, Lord Bahubali and Lord Bharata. The statue of Rishabhanatha is in height and the tallest of all the three; on either side are the statues of Bharata and Bahubali, each being . There is a  kirti stambh (literally meaning "pillar of glory") also present here. Many muni maharaj (Jain saints) often stay here and preach to their followers before moving on.

Kanheri caves

The caves were sculpted by Buddhist residents around the 1st century BCE. The area was a settlement that once served as inns for travelers. The word Kanheri comes from the Sanskrit word Krishnagiri which means "black mountain".

Buddhist Viharas

Seven Buddhist caves older than the Kanheri Caves have been discovered very recently. Detailed exploration and documentation is awaited from The Archaeological Survey of India.

Access 
The Western Express Highway (NH 8) passes by the park entrance. Buses are available on holidays and Sundays from Mumbai to the park. Also, chartered vehicles can be hired for groups to visit the park.

The park can also be accessed from Goregaon (BNHS, Film City).

The park is accessible from the eastern side as well, through Mulund (Vasant Garden) and through Thane from two locations – Yeoor and Tikuji-Ni-Wadi, near the Nature Center.

The nearest airport is Chhatrapati Shivaji International Airport at Santa Cruz  from the park. The nearest railway stations are Borivali and Goregaon on Western line (Mumbai Suburban Railway), which are connected to Churchgate railway station & also Mulund and Thane on the Central line (Mumbai Suburban Railway), which are connected to Chhatrapati Shivaji Terminus.

Park hours 
The main gates open at 7.30 a.m. and close at 5.30 p.m. The park also provides monthly and yearly passes for morning walks. The access timing for pass-holders is 5.00 a.m. to 7.30 a.m. only, and personal transport vehicles are allowed within the park to the Kanheri Caves by paying a nominal amount at the main gate.

References

Sources
Parts of the article referred to from the Times of India article dated 5 July 2004
 Amol Patwardhan (2014) Butterflies of Sanjay Gandhi National Park, Mumbai, Maharashtra, India, Ambient Science, 1(1): 7–15.
 Sanjay Gandhi National Park: Flickr Group photos
Kasambe, R. (2012): Butterfly fauna of the Sanjay Gandhi National Park and Mumbai. Bionotes. 14 (3): 76–80

External links

 
 SGNP link on Maharashtra FD Website of "Sanjay Gandhi National Park Borivali, Mumbai 400066".
 A detailed Review of Kanheri Caves and : Read this before you go.

Parks in Mumbai
Malabar Coast moist forests
National parks in Maharashtra
Protected areas established in 1969
Mumbai Suburban district
Borivali
1969 establishments in Maharashtra